Aşağı Avşar is a village and municipality in the Aghjabadi Rayon of Azerbaijan. It has a population of 1,900.

References

Populated places in Aghjabadi District